3 P.M. may refer to:

A time on the 12-hour clock
3pm, a New Zealand children's show

Date and time disambiguation pages